Bird Cove is a town in the Canadian province of Newfoundland and Labrador.

Demographics 

See also
 List of cities and towns in Newfoundland and Labrador
 Newfoundland and Labrador Route 430

References

Towns in Newfoundland and Labrador